Liam Jegou (born 9 January 1996) is an Irish slalom canoeist who has competed at the international level since 2011. He is based in France but competes for Ireland. He competes in C1 individually and also competed in C2 with Cade Ryan from 2012 to 2014.

Jegou was born in Brittany to an Irish mother and a Breton father. For the first two years of his life, he grew up in Switzerland, before moving to Ballyvaughan, County Clare for the next five years. At the age of seven, his family relocated to Huningue, France.

He won a silver medal in the C1 team event at the 2020 European Championships in Prague. He has also won two medals at the ICF World Junior and U23 Canoe Slalom Championships, with one silver in the junior category (C1: 2014) and one bronze in the U23 category (C1: 2019). He earned his best senior world championship result, of 24th, at the 2018 ICF Canoe Slalom World Championships in Rio de Janeiro.

Jegou represented Ireland in the C1 event at the 2020 Summer Olympics in Tokyo, after Ireland successfully secured a quota place at the 2019 ICF Canoe Slalom World Championships. This marked the first time Ireland was represented in this event since 1996. Liam qualified 11th fastest for the semi-final, and finished in 15th place after incurring 100-seconds of penalties.

World Cup individual podiums

References

External links 

 
 
 
 

1996 births
Living people
Irish male canoeists
Irish people of French descent
French people of Irish descent
Canoeists at the 2020 Summer Olympics
Olympic canoeists of Ireland